Makhachkala Rus bombing was a July 1, 2005 incident in which at least 11 members of the elite Rus unit of the Russian federal Internal Troops were killed and 25 people wounded in the bomb attack outside a public bath in Makhachkala, Dagestan.

The federal commandos of the MVD Rus unit had been sent to Dagestan only two weeks before to help the local MVD forces conduct "operation filter", which started after a 4 June 2005 rebel bomb blew up an UAZ vehicle with three policemen inside. The attack closely resembled a January 2001 bombing that killed seven Interior Ministry troops at the same site.

In few days after the bombing the chief of the city's Interior Ministry and several other local police officials were fired.

References

21st-century mass murder in Russia
Attacks in Russia in 2005
Operations of the Second Chechen War
Improvised explosive device bombings in Russia
Mass murder in 2005
Caucasian Front (militant group)
Makhachkala
Terrorist incidents in Russia in 2005
July 2005 events in Russia